Pam Longobardi (born 1958) is an American contemporary artist and ecofeminist, currently living and working in Atlanta, Georgia. She is known internationally for sculptural works and installations created from plastic debris, primarily from marine and coastal environments, as a primary material. Much of her work includes community-based research, such as carbon or plastic audits, as well as collaborative art creation.

In 2013, Longobardi was awarded The Hudgens Prize  and in 2014, she earned the title Distinguished University Professor of Art at Georgia State, and was named  Artist-in-Residence of the Oceanic Society. In 2019, she was appointed Regents’ Professor by the Board of Regents for the State of Georgia.

Early life and education

Pam Longobardi grew up in New Jersey, the child of an ocean lifeguard and a Delaware state diving champion, and credits her parents' relationship to the water with her own scientific and artistic interests. Longobardi moved to Atlanta in 1970. 
She received a B.S. in Science Education from Montana State University in 1982. Longobardi then went on to earn her M.F.A. degree, also from Montana State University.

Career
The entanglement of science and art is central to Longobardi's practice and aesthetic: "I see some aspects of the methodology of the artist and scientist as very similar: long periods of intensive research, immersion in materials to better understand their properties, inquisitiveness and curiosity as driving forces, a desire to unpack ‘reality’ to better understand our relationship to it."

Since 2006, Longobardi has been engaged in The Drifters Project.  Begun in 2006, its name taken from the term drift – objects that are carried by currents and air. Ocean drift is, today, primarily plastic. Longobardi has collected this drift plastic to create abstract sculptures and installations.  One iteration of The Drifters Project was displayed at the 2009 Venice Biennale, at the ARTE VISIVI collateral exhibitions. In 2010, Edizione Charta (Milan, NY) produced a photo-essay book entitled Drifters: Plastics, Pollution, Personhood that included photographs and essays by Longobardi and three other writers.

"All these things collapse for me in the drifting ocean plastic object: it IS an artifact of my specific human evolutionary time; it IS made from petroleum that is the fossil sunlight and ancient plants, animals and yes, dinosaurs, that roamed the past Earth; it IS a biological raft for invasive creatures; it IS a toxic floating time bomb that is changing the human and animal body and the very ocean itself; and it IS a future fossil of the Anthropocene."

In 2013 Longobardi was selected to be lead artist in the GYRE Expedition, an art-science research expedition that assembled a team of notable marine scientists, journalists, filmmakers and artists to trawl remote Alaskan coastlines and to document collaboratively the impacts of plastic pollution on these delicate ecosystems. Her colleagues on the expedition included chief exhibition scientist Carl Safina, artist Mark Dion, filmmaker J.J. Kelly, photographer Andy Hughes, and others: all of these are featured, along with Longobardi, in a twenty-minute National Geographic film, GYRE, which aired in 2013.  Of Longobardi, Dion says "Her knowledge of the subject and commitment is extraordinary."  The artistic outcomes from this expedition were shown first at the exhibition entitled Gyre: The Plastic Ocean at the Anchorage Museum at Rasmuson Center in Anchorage, Alaska, a show which later travelled to the CDC's Museum in Atlanta, Georgia and other museums across the U.S. Longobardi's contributions include "Economies of Scale" and "Bounty, Pilfered," both characteristic of her sculptural found-plastic installations. Longobardi uses "materials like sulfurated potash and sodium chloride to oxidize expanses of copper, pouring and wiping different mixtures over the surfaces" to make scenes that "appear otherworldly" but in a series entitled Anthropocene, she "keeps them decidedly earth-based."

Longobardi also produces paintings with an  "elemental aesthetic," incorporating natural processes such as chemical patinas that also crystallize; light-sensitive photo imaging, magnetism, mirror reflection, after-image, and phosphorescence.

Awards
 2019 Regents Professor, awarded by the Board of Regents for the State of Georgia.
2016 Focus Fellowship Award
2016 Special Honorary Mention for Plastic Free Island (short film), Cinemare International Ocean Film Festival, Kiel, Germany
2016 Bronze Award, Short Films Category, Spotlight Film Awards
2016 Artist Residency Fellowship, Ionian Center for Arts and Culture (Kefalonia, Greece)
2014 Distinguished University Professor, Georgia State University
2014 Artist-in-Residence of the Oceanic Society
2013 The Hudgens Prize

Reviews
 Keck, Terra. 2019. “Harbingers and Oracles.” ART511 Magazine.
 Bell, Ellen. 2017. “A Culture Defined by What It Discards: Art for the Anthropocene.” PLANET Magazine. UK. May, n. 26.
 Turner-Seydel, Laura. 2017. “Breaking Free from Plastics through Art.” Southern Seasons. Fall issue, p. 36-38.
 Tauches, Karen. 2017. “Messages from the Ocean: An Interview with Pam Longobardi.” Pelican Bomb. January 11 issue.
 Alaimo, Stacy. 2016. Exposed: Environmental Politics and Pleasures in Post-Human Times.University of Minnesota Press. 138–140,188, Figure 8.
 Baker, Shanna. 2015. “New Wave Art,” Hakai Magazine, April 22, 2015.
 Bellows, Layla. n.d. “Plastic Reduction Atlanta Took On the Plastic Straw,” Atlanta Magazine.
 Borek, Barbara. 2016. “Wasser-Kulturen: Die Austellung Bitteres Wasser,” Art in Berlin,July 14, 2016.
 Butler, Jared. 2016. “Hathaway Contemporary Sets the Bar High,”Burnaway, July 27, 2016.
 Breedlove, Byron. 2015. “Welcome to the World of the Plastic Beach.” Emerging Infectious Diseases, 21(4), 736–737, April 2015.
 DiFrisco, Emily. 2016. “From Bali to Komodo:  Documenting Plastic Pollution”, Plastic Free Times, November 2, 2016.
 Eaton, Natasha. 2015. International Journal of Maritime History, Book Review, ‘Framing the Ocean’ p. 587-90, August 4, 2015.
 Feaster, Felicia. 2016. “Group Show at new gallery Abounds with Interesting Work,” Atlanta Journal-Constitution, May 16, 2016.
 Grout, Pam. 2015. “A Relational Existence: Art as Powerful Voice to Spark Social Change,” ArtDesk. Issue 5 (Fall/Winter 2015): 18.
 Hansel, Sally. 2015. ‘Terrible Beauty: A Conversation with Pam Longobardi,’ Sculpture Magazine. Vol. 34, No. 3 (April 2015).
 Hawk, Steve. 2014. Sierra Magazine, "The Finer Side of Flotsam." July 30, 2014.
Jeffery, Celina. 2015. “Artists Curate the Expedition” in The Artist As Curator. Chicago: Intellect Books.
 Jeffery, Celina. 2016. “Pam Longobardi: The Ocean Gleaner,” DRAIN Magazine.
 Kontra, Ally. 2016. “From Trash to Treasure:  Plastic Pollution in the Pacific.” February 19, 2016.
 Meier, Allison. 2015. “Artists Confront the Plastic Pollution of Our Ocean,” HYPERALLERGIC, September 1, 2015.
 Regan, Sheila. 2016. “State of the Art is an Unstuffy Contemporary Art Show for All, City Pages, Minneapolis, February 19, 2016.
 Relyea, Laura. 2016. “David Hathaway to Open on the Westside,” ArtsATL, Jan 4 year
 Sentman, Wayne. 2014. “Dragons to Debris: An Oceanic Society Expedition to Komodo,”
 Shaw, Kurt. 2015. “Art Review: Second Nature at James Gallery,” Pittsburgh Tribune. October 7, 2015.  
 Turner Seydel, Laura. 2017. "Breaking Free from Plastics Through Art." HuffPost. October 12, 2017.         
 Valentine, Ben. 2015. ‘One Artist’s Quest to Turn Beach Plastic Into Art’, HYPERALLERGIC.August 26, 2015. One Artist's Quest to Turn Beach Plastic into Art
 Vega, Muriel. 2016. “Hathaway David Contemporary Opens with Inaugural Exhibition." Creative Loafing. April 26, 2016.
 Wagner-Lawlor, Jennifer. 2016. “Regarding Intimacy, Regard, and Transformative Feminist Practice in the Art of Pamela Longobardi.” Feminist Studies 42.3: 649–688
 Webb, Victoria. 2016. “Hathaway David Contemporary in Atlanta.” Furious Dreams,June 10, 2016. Hathaway David Contemporary in Atlanta | Furious Dreams – art blog by Victoria Webb

References

20th-century American women artists
21st-century American women artists
University of Georgia alumni
Montana State University alumni
American contemporary artists
Environmental artists
Activists from Georgia (U.S. state)
1958 births
Living people
Artists from Georgia (U.S. state)
American women environmentalists
American environmentalists